The ATF Dingo is a German heavily armored military MRAP infantry mobility vehicle based on a Unimog chassis with a V-hull design, produced by the company Krauss-Maffei Wegmann (KMW). The first prototype of the Dingo 1 was completed in 1995 and the first production Dingo 1 entered service in 2000 with the German Army. It is designed to withstand land mines, rifle fire, artillery fragments and NBC-threats. ATF stands for Allschutz-Transport-Fahrzeug, meaning all-protected transport vehicle in German. It is named after the Australian native dog, the dingo. The Dingo 2 entered service in late 2004 after undergoing trials from November 2003-May 2004. Currently KMW is developing the Dingo 2 GFF for the German Army with increased internal volume.

Textron signed an exclusive deal to produce and market KMW's Dingo in the United States. However, Textron chose its own more expensive and heavier M1117 Armored Security Vehicle for the MRAP competition, which did not receive a contract.

Design
The ATF Dingo has a modular design with five elements: chassis, protection cell, storage space, engine compartment, and bottom mine blast deflector. Its design is lighter and includes an armored chassis with a blast pan instead of the more common monocoque hull found in modern blast resistant vehicles. IBD's layered MEXAS is used and the windows are angled to deflect blasts and bullets. A tarpaulin is used over the back storage area instead of metal to save weight.

The Dingo's standard armament is a Rheinmetall MG3 7.62 mm machine gun in a remote-controlled turret on the top of the vehicle, borrowed from KMW's Fennek. The operator sits safely inside the cabin, controlling the weapon with an electro-optical sight with night vision capability.

In 2008 the Bundeswehr ordered several hundred fully remote-controlled weapons stations from KMW, for its Dingos and other armored vehicles: the light FLW 100 (for the MG3 or the Heckler & Koch MG4), and the heavy FLW 200 (for the M3M .50 BMG or the HK GMG automatic grenade launcher). The weapons station is controlled by an operator viewing a monitor inside the vehicle.

The ATF Dingo 2 is an advanced version of the Dingo, based on the upgraded Unimog U 5000 chassis with improved protection and more payload. It is offered in two versions, a 3,250 mm wheelbase version (3.5 tonnes payload) and a 3,850 mm wheelbase version (4 tonnes payload) . The Dingo 2 can seat eight personnel.

Operational use
In September 2022, Germany announced that they would provide 50 ATF Dingos to Ukraine to use in the 2022 Russian Invasion of Ukraine.

Operators

Current operators

Gallery

References

External links 
 Krauss-Maffei Wegmann - Website of the manufacturer
 DINGO - Protection in the 10-Tonne Class
 Dingo 2 in the Austrian Armed Forces

Military trucks
Off-road vehicles
Armoured fighting vehicles of the post–Cold War period
Armoured personnel carriers of Germany
Post–Cold War military vehicles of Germany
Military vehicles introduced in the 2000s
Armoured personnel carriers of the post–Cold War period